Salesian English School (Secondary Section), is a secondary boys school in Hong Kong. Founded by the Roman Catholic religious institute the Salesians of Don Bosco, it is located at Chai Wan Road, Shau Kei Wan, Hong Kong Island. The school's patron saint is Blessed Filippo Rinaldi and the motto is "Alere Flammam".

History
In 1941, due to the great demand at the time, the Salesians of Don Bosco established the Salesian Children's Home under the Salesian Seminary, the progenitor of the Salesian English School. The school was operated by the Salesian China Province of Mary Help of Christians.

The primary section of the Salesian English School was established in 1950 with the secondary section following in 1955. In 1959, the first senior secondary students sat for the Hong Kong Certificate of Education Examination. The construction of the house of the secondary section was completed and started to operate in the same year. Then Hong Kong Governor Sir Robert Brown Black was invited as guest in the opening ceremony. The new indoor playground and new wing construction project were launched in 1966 and completed in 1972. Three years later, the school has joined the scheme of subsidy school (DSS).

In the 1990s, the first female teacher was employed at the school, which had not happened since the opening year.

Entering the 21st century, the school has proposed reform schemes in improving teaching methods and campus environment. To help students adapt the technology-orientated era, the school was renovated and new equipment was imported to assist the new education system.

Due to the education reform in 2000, the school was classified as Chinese as Medium of Instruction (CMI) school which has gravely affected the future development of the school.

In 2018, the "Hing Yik Footbridge" was damaged in an accident and was permanently removed.

Notable alumni
Tony F. Chan, mathematician, president of the Hong Kong University of Science and Technology, assistant director of the Mathematical and Physical Sciences Directorate at the US National Science Foundation
Raymond Chan Chi-chuen, member of the Legislative Council of Hong Kong (representing the New Territories East constituency) and former chief executive officer of Hong Kong Reporter.
Kenneth Ma, Hong Kong actor
Yip Sai Wing, Hong Kong musician, drummer and co-founder of the rock band Beyond
 Ng Cho-nam, SBS, JP, associate professor of geography at the University of Hong Kong, former director of the Conservancy Association

References

External links
 

Boys' schools in Hong Kong
Shau Kei Wan
Catholic secondary schools in Hong Kong
Salesian secondary schools